Corytophanes hernandesii, also known commonly as Hernandez's helmeted basilisk and el turipache de montaña in Spanish, is a species of lizard in the family Corytophanidae. The species is native to Central America and southern Mexico.

Etymology
The specific name, hernandesii, is in honor of Spanish naturalist Francisco Hernández (1514–1587).

Geographic range
C. hernandesii is found in Belize, Guatemala, and Honduras, and in the southern Mexican states of Campeche, Chiapas, Oaxaca, Puebla, Quintana Roo, San Luis Potosí, Veracruz, and Yucatán.

Habitat

Behavior
C. hernandesii is diurnal and mostly arboreal.

Reproduction
C. hernandesii is oviparous.

References

Further reading
Gray JE (1831). "A Synopsis of the Species of the Class Reptilia". pp. 1–110. In: Griffith E (1831). The Animal Kingdom Arranged in Conformity with its Organization, by the Baron Cuvier, Member of the Institute of France &c. &c. &c. with Additional Descriptions of All the Species hitherto Named, and of Many not before Noticed, Volume the Ninth. London: Whittaker, Treacher, and Co. 481 + 110 pp. ("Chamœleopsis hernandesii Wiedemann [sic]", new species, p. 45).
McCranie JR, Townsend JH, Wilson LD (2004). "Corytophanes hernandesii (Wiegmann), Hernandez's Helmeted Basilisk, Turipache de Montaña". Catalogue of American Amphibians and Reptiles 790: 1–6.

Corytophanes
Reptiles described in 1831
Taxa named by Arend Friedrich August Wiegmann